RT Normae is an R Coronae Borealis type variable star in the constellation Norma. It has a baseline magnitude of 9.8, dropping down to 14.7 at its minima.

It has less than 55% the mass of the Sun and an effective (surface) temperature of around 7000 K.

References 

Normae, RT
R Coronae Borealis variables
Norma (constellation)
080365
Carbon stars
Durchmusterung objects